The Rural Municipality of Benson No. 35 is a rural municipality (RM) in the Canadian province of Saskatchewan within Census Division No. 1 and  Division No. 1. It is located in the southeast portion of the province.

History 
The RM of Benson No. 35 incorporated as a rural municipality on December 13, 1909.

Heritage properties
There is one historical property within the RM.

St. Luke's Lutheran Church - Constructed in 1929, in the hamlet of Woodley, Saskatchewan.

Geography

Communities and localities 
The following unincorporated communities are within the RM.

Localities
 Benson
 Bryant
 Cullen
 Woodley

Demographics 

Economy 
Agriculture plays an important role in the rural municipality with 207,200 acres (95%) of land in under cultivation. There are also 300 oil wells in the municipality.

Government 
The RM of Benson No. 35 is governed by an elected municipal council and an appointed administrator that meets on the first Friday of every month. The reeve of the RM is David Hoffort while its administrator is Chantel Walsh. The RM's office is located in Benson.

Transportation  
The two airports within the rural municipality are the Estevan (Blue Sky) Aerodrome and Estevan/Bryant Airport.

References 

B

Division No. 1, Saskatchewan